Captain María Esperanza di Alma LaGuerta ( or) portrayed by Lauren Vélez, is a fictional character who is the Lieutenant at the fictitious Miami-Metro Homicide Department in the Showtime television series Dexter.  Despite being a protagonist for most of the series, Maria LaGuerta, (the superior officer of main characters Dexter and Debra Morgan) ultimately emerges as one of the story's main antagonists by Season 7.

Character history
Discussions between LaGuerta and Angel Batista in the first and fourth seasons give minor insight into LaGuerta's backstory. Her family is said to reside entirely in Cuba. She mentions being alone in a strange land, implying that she was sent to live in America on her own.

Season one
In the series' beginning, LaGuerta is introduced as a tough and ambitious woman more skilled in political gamesmanship than actual police work. She harbors an intense dislike for Dexter Morgan's sister Debra. At the end of the first season, her superior, Captain Tom Matthews, has her removed from command for her failure to capture the Ice Truck Killer.

Season two
Early in season two, LaGuerta continues to struggle with her demotion and annoyance with her replacement, Esmee Pascal. She resorts to sleeping with Pascal's fiancee, Bertrand, which quickly drives Pascal to paranoia and instability. Pascal's increasingly erratic behavior results in Matthews being forced to remove her and reinstate LaGuerta.

When her friend, former partner, and former lover, James Doakes, becomes the prime suspect in the Bay Harbor Butcher case, she tries to clear his name. She learns from a questionable source of two Special Forces missions Doakes took part in that directly conflicted with the deaths of two Butcher victims. In the season finale, Doakes is found dead in a seemingly accidental explosion, along with drug dealer Jose Garza, and the case is closed. The evidence LaGuerta finds is ignored. After Doakes' death, LaGuerta asks police officers for donations to his memorial fund, refusing to think of her deceased friend as a serial killer.

Season three
In season three, as she recovers from the trauma of Doakes' death, LaGuerta leads an investigation into the murder of Oscar Prado, the brother of her ex-boyfriend, Assistant District Attorney Miguel Prado. She also develops a close relationship with defense attorney Ellen Wolf and is devastated when she is found murdered. Thanks to some personal investigative work, along with Dexter's input, she discovers that Miguel killed Wolf. She confides in Dexter, as he is the "only other one who knows". After Miguel's own death at Dexter's hand, she becomes distraught that the Cuban community is thinking about naming a highway after him. She wants to find admissible evidence to prove he killed Wolf, but Dexter is able to convince her that doing so would only hurt Miguel's family and the community and that even then the case would be weak. Reluctantly, LaGuerta drops it.

Season four
At the start of season four, LaGuerta is shown to be romantically involved with Det. Angel Batista. They keep their romance hidden from their colleagues within the homicide department, aside from Dexter, in whom both Batista and LaGuerta confide. Their relationship hits a roadblock when she tells their superiors about their relationship so that it cannot be used against them during a trial. The consequence of her disclosure is a threat of reassignment; either Batista or LaGuerta will have to move out of Homicide. Deciding that their jobs are integral parts of who they both are, the two decide to end their relationship, and sign affidavits to that effect. Staying away from each other does not prove easy, however, and they begin having secret liaisons once more. In order to circumvent a reprimand from higher up, they secretly get married with Dexter as a witness.

Season five
In season five, LaGuerta and Batista begin to have problems as she becomes too demanding of him, he then becomes more impulsive. Their problems intensify when she publicly scapegoats Debra for making a mistake LaGuerta herself made, leading to the deaths of several people. This eventually causes Batista to look at her even more negatively. However, they make up by the end of the season.

Season six
LaGuerta and Batista divorce after realizing they want different things. She is promoted to Captain after blackmailing Matthews over a madam's contact list which includes his name. Matthews assigns Debra as the new Lieutenant; this angers LaGuerta, who had promised the position to Batista. Debra is unsure of herself at first and goes to LaGuerta for advice. LaGuerta gives Debra unsound advice in order to undermine her, but Debra soon grows confident enough in her own abilities to survive on her own. When Matthews is discovered to have been with another prostitute, LaGuerta initially tells Debra to cover it up. When Debra finds proof of Matthews' involvement, LaGuerta makes it clear that she will depose her if she steps out of line.

Season seven
At the beginning of this season, LaGuerta discovers a blood slide containing serial killer Travis Marshall's blood at the scene of his death. Realizing that this is reminiscent of the Bay Harbor Butcher's modus operandi, she begins to investigate whether the Butcher is still alive, and sets out to prove Doakes' innocence. Eventually, she begins to suspect Dexter when she learns that he moved his boat during the Bay Harbor Butcher investigation. She enlists help from Matthews, who tells her that her suspicions are unfounded.

As LaGuerta and Matthews dig into the case, they revisit the cabin Doakes died in and discover that Santos Jimenez had rented the cabin, prompting Matthews to reveal to LaGuerta that Jimenez was responsible for the death of Dexter and Brian Moser's mother. LaGuerta's suspicion of Dexter intensifies after she learns about his background and then hears of the disappearance of Jimenez. They search the area and find evidence of Doakes's involvement, which LaGuerta insists was planted.

Eventually, LaGuerta forms a plan to finally confirm whether Dexter is the Butcher; she pulls strings to have Hector Estrada, the man who ordered Dexter's mother killed, released from prison in hopes that Dexter will go after him. Sure enough, Dexter finds Estrada and is about to kill him when he realizes that LaGuerta has set him up. He reluctantly lets Estrada go so he can escape, but LaGuerta deduces what was about to happen when she sees the killing room.

LaGuerta has Dexter arrested for killing Estrada, who is in fact still alive but is forced to let him go when forensic specialist Vince Masuka provides evidence proving Dexter's innocence. This turn of events only strengthens LaGuerta's resolve to arrest Dexter, especially after she finds circumstantial evidence that Dexter and Debra were near the scene of Marshall's death. She confronts Debra with this evidence, but Debra fends her off.

As this situation escalates, Dexter decides the only solution is to kill LaGuerta. He kidnaps and kills Estrada, and then drugs LaGuerta unconscious when she arrives at the scene. His plan is to shoot her and then stage the scene to make it appear as if she and Estrada killed each other. Just then, Debra finds him and begs him not to kill LaGuerta, who regains consciousness. LaGuerta pleads with Debra to kill Dexter, saying she's a good person who's not like her brother. Dexter resigns himself to his fate and drops his knife. Debra, in tears, instead shoots a shocked LaGuerta in the chest, killing her.

Difference from novel
In the novels, LaGuerta's first name is "Migdia". In Darkly Dreaming Dexter, LaGuerta is portrayed as a spiteful, manipulative woman skilled only in political gamesmanship. In the TV series, however, she is cast in a more sympathetic light. In both the novel and the TV series, she flirts semi-openly with Dexter, much to his annoyance. In the first book, LaGuerta is stabbed to death by Dexter's brother Brian; in the TV series, LaGuerta remains alive and very much a factor in Dexter's life until her death at the end of Season 7.

References

External links
 Maria LaGuerta on IMDb

Dexter (series) characters
Fictional police lieutenants
Fictional police captains
Characters in American novels of the 21st century
Television characters introduced in 2004
Fictional immigrants to the United States
Fictional Miami-Dade Police Department detectives
American female characters in television
Female characters in television
Fictional murdered people
Fictional Cuban-American people